Fillipe Soutto Mayor Nogueira Ferreira, better known as Fillipe Soutto, is a Brazilian footballer playing as a defensive midfielder who plays for Botafogo-SP.

He is one of several players revealed in the basic categories of Atlético Mineiro.

Career
Fillipe arrived in the main group of the Atlético Mineiro in 2010 in the Copa U-23, a competition held among ten clubs in Series A Brazilian football.

On December 19, 2012, in an exchange for Alecsandro, Souto signed with Club de Regatas Vasco da Gama for 2013 season.

Career statistics

Honours
Atlético Mineiro
Campeonato Mineiro: 2012

Joinville
Campeonato Brasileiro Série B: 2014

Contract
 Atlético Mineiro.

References

External links
 Galo Digital
Fillipe Soutto at ZeroZero

1989 births
Living people
Brazilian footballers
Campeonato Brasileiro Série A players
Campeonato Brasileiro Série B players
Clube Atlético Mineiro players
CR Vasco da Gama players
Joinville Esporte Clube players
Clube Náutico Capibaribe players
Association football midfielders
Footballers from Belo Horizonte